Calvin Jones (January 26, 1951 – October 24, 2021) was an American professional football player who was a cornerback in the National Football League (NFL) with the Denver Broncos. He played college football at the University of Washington in Seattle, and graduated from Balboa High School in San Francisco in the fall of 1968.

In 1970, Jones, along with Mark Wheeler and Ira Hammon, quit the UW football team, holding a press conference denouncing racial discrimination on the part of the coaching staff, led by head coach Jim Owens. In 1971, Don Smith, an African-American, was appointed UW assistant athletic director.  Smith asked Jones to return to the UW, and Jones  became an All-American in 1972.

Jones was selected in the fifteenth round of the 1973 NFL Draft (373rd overall) by the Washington Redskins and played four seasons with the Denver Broncos.

Jones died on October 24, 2021, at the age of 70.

See also
 Washington Huskies football statistical leaders

References

External links
 

1951 births
2021 deaths
Players of American football from San Francisco
American football cornerbacks
Washington Huskies football players
Denver Broncos players